Uliyankudi is a village in the Udayarpalayam taluk of Ariyalur district, Tamil Nadu, India.

Demographics 

As per the 2001 census, Uliyankudi had a total population of 3365 with 1683 males and 1682 females.

References 

Villages in Ariyalur district